American singer and songwriter Steve Earle has released twenty-one studio albums, including collaborations with the Del McCoury Band and Shawn Colvin.  Earle's work reflects a wide range of styles, including bluegrass, multiple styles of rock, folk, blues and country. He or his labels have also released six live albums and eight compilation albums.

Earle has charted several singles on the Billboard Hot Country Songs, Mainstream Rock Airplay, Adult Alternative Airplay charts.

Studio albums

1980s

1990s

2000s

2010s

2020s

Live albums

Compilation albums

Singles

1980s

1990s

2000s–present

Videography

Video albums

Music videos

Notes

References

Country music discographies
Discographies of American artists
Rock music discographies